The Honorary Consul is a 1983 British drama film directed by John Mackenzie, and starring Michael Caine, Richard Gere, Bob Hoskins and Elpidia Carrillo. It is based on the 1973 novel The Honorary Consul by Graham Greene.

Plot summary
The story is set in Corrientes, a small town in north east Argentina. Eduardo Plarr is a doctor of Paraguayan and British parentage. As a boy, he was forced to flee his native Paraguay after the arrest and subsequent disappearance of his father, a dissident. 
Plarr makes the acquaintance of the dissolute and heavy-drinking Charley Fortnum, the honorary British consul. He also meets Colonel Perez, the local police chief. 

While attending patients in a shanty town, Plarr meets Leon, an old school friend from Paraguay. Leon was ordained as a priest but left the priesthood to get married. He is now involved in a group of militant activists.

Fortnum asks Plarr to come to his house to attend to his wife, who is complaining of stomach cramps. Plarr recognises the wife as Clara, a girl who previously worked at the town's brothel. Plarr later meets Clara while she is out shopping. They begin a passionate affair.

Leon visits Plarr in his surgery, along with Aquino, another activist. The two men try to persuade Plarr to help in a plot to kidnap the American ambassador, who is due to visit the district, and to exchange him for political prisoners held in Paraguay. Plarr initially refuses, but reluctantly agrees when Leon tells him that his father is one of the prisoners. Plarr gives Leon details of the ambassador's itinerary which he obtains from Fortnum. He also gives him some morphine to be used to pacify the ambassador.

The kidnap is planned for the day of  the ambassador's visit to a nearby waterfall. His party sets out in two cars, with Fortnum driving the first  car and the ambassador in the passenger seat. The rest of the party follows in a second car. The kidnappers' first attempt to intercept the cars fails when they get held up by a military convoy. A second, apparently successful, attempt is made on the return journey.

Later, Plarr receives a phone call from Leon, who is afraid that the ambassador has fallen into a coma after receiving an overdose of the morphine. Plarr goes to a shack in the shanty town where the group is holding the ambassador. He determines that the patient is in no danger from the morphine, but informs Leon that the person they kidnapped is not the American ambassador: he is the Fortnum, the British consul. While at the waterfall, the ambassador, shocked by Fortnum's reckless driving and heavy drinking, had insisted that they change places for the return journey; the ambassador took the wheel with the consul in the passenger seat, hence the wrong person being kidnapped.

Despite Plarr warning the dissidents that Fortnum has no value to the authorities, the group proceed with their demand for the release of ten political prisoners. Plarr travels to Buenos Aires in an unsuccessful attempt to persuade the British ambassador to intervene.
On his return, Plarr learns from Perez that his father had been killed a year earlier while trying to escape.

Plarr is again summoned to the shack, this time to treat Fortnum for a gunshot wound sustained while trying to flee from a latrine. Plarr is furious with Leon for misleading him over his father's death. Fortnum overhears Plarr telling Leon of his adultery with Clara and saying that he, not Fortnum, is the father of the child that Clara is expecting. 

Meanwhile, police and soldiers arrive at the shanty town and surround the shack. Plarr leaves the shack in an attempt to negotiate with Perez, but is shot down. The soldiers then storm the shack, killing all the occupants except Fortnum. On his return home, Fortnum and Clara are reconciled. He accepts the fact that he is not the father of the baby, and even suggests naming the child Eduardo, after Plarr.

Cast
 Michael Caine as Charley Fortnum
 Richard Gere as Eduardo Plarr
 Bob Hoskins as Colonel Perez
 Elpidia Carrillo as Clara Fortnum
 Joaquim de Almeida as Leon
 A Martinez as Aquino
 Geoffrey Palmer as the British Ambassador
 Leonard Maguire as Dr. Humphries

Production
The film was produced by Norma Heyman, the first British woman to produce a solo independent feature film.

The movie was filmed on location in Veracruz, Mexico and Mexico City, and at the Shepperton Studios in Surrey, England.

Response

The film was successful in the United Kingdom and Europe. In the United States, it earned about $6 million in box office receipts and received some negative reviews.

Notes

References

External links
 
 

1983 films
Films set in Argentina
1980s political drama films
British political drama films
Adultery in films
Films based on British novels
Films based on works by Graham Greene
Paramount Pictures films
Films directed by John Mackenzie (film director)
Films scored by Stanley Myers
1983 drama films
1980s English-language films
1980s British films